Where We Are Tour may refer to:
 Where We Are Tour (Westlife), a 2010 tour by Westlife
Where We Are Tour: Live from the O2
 Where We Are Tour (One Direction), a 2014 tour by One Direction